Perfluoropentacene (PFP) is an n-type organic semiconductor, which is made by fluorination of the p-type semiconductor pentacene. It has a blueish-black color, and is used for molecular thin-film devices (like OLEDs or OFETs).

References

External links 
 

Organic semiconductors
Fluorocarbons